William Stewart Sandeman (born November 30, 1942 in Providence, Rhode Island) was an American football offensive tackle in the NFL for the Dallas Cowboys, New Orleans Saints, and Atlanta Falcons.  He played college football at the University of the Pacific.

Early years
Sandeman was a notable swimmer at Lincoln High School and started to play football as a junior.

He enrolled at Stockton Junior College where he was an All-American as a swimmer. After his sophomore season, he accepted a football scholarship from the University of the Pacific, where he played tight end and defensive end. He also competed in swimming.

In 2009, he was inducted into the Pacific Athletics Hall of Fame.

Professional career

Dallas Cowboys
Sandeman was not selected in the 1965 NFL Draft and was signed as an undrafted free agent by the Dallas Cowboys. He injured his knee early in training camp and was placed on the injured reserve list.

In 1966, he was being converted to the offensive line, so he played both on offense and defense. He played in eight games before being placed on the injured reserve list.

New Orleans Saints
He was selected by the New Orleans Saints in the 1967 NFL expansion draft. He was a part of the inaugural team and was released after playing in two games.

Atlanta Falcons
In 1967, he was claimed off waivers by the Atlanta Falcons. In 1968, he became the regular starter at left tackle, before suffering a crushed disk on his back. In 1971, he regained his starter position and appeared in all 14 games.

In 1973, he started 12 games but was limited with knee problems. In 1974, he was placed on the injured reserve list after having back surgery to correct a slipped disk. On July 17, 1975, he announced his retirement.

References

External links
 From Swimmer To Footballer

1942 births
Living people
Players of American football from Providence, Rhode Island
Players of American football from Stockton, California
American football offensive tackles
Delta College Mustangs football players
Pacific Tigers football players
Dallas Cowboys players
New Orleans Saints players
Atlanta Falcons players